The 2011 Atlantic Hockey Tournament was the 8th Atlantic Hockey Tournament played between March 5 and March 19, 2011 at campus locations and at the Blue Cross Arena in Rochester, New York. The winner of the tournament received Atlantic Hockey's automatic bid to the 2011 NCAA Division I Men's Ice Hockey Tournament.

Format
The tournament features four rounds of play. For the first round, the twelve teams in the league are divided into the two "scheduling pods" used to devise the season schedule.  Within each pod, the top two seeds received a bye, while the third and fourth seeds in each pod hosted the fifth and sixth seeds for a single game, with the winners advancing to the quarterfinals.

In the quarterfinals, the teams are reseeded without reference to the pods.  The top four remaining seeds will host the bottom four remaining seeds in best-of-three series, with the winners advancing to the semi-finals.  In the semifinals, the highest and lowest seeds and second-highest and second-lowest seeds will play a single game each, with the winners advancing to the championship game. The tournament champion will receive an automatic bid to the 2011 NCAA Men's Division I Ice Hockey Tournament.

Current standings
Note: GP = Games played; W = Wins; L = Losses; T = Ties; PTS = Points; GF = Goals For; GA = Goals Against
The overall statistics include postseason games.

Bracket

Note: * denotes overtime period(s)

Results

First round

(12)(6E) American International at (9)(3E) Army

(11)(5E) Sacred Heart at (10)(4E) Bentley

(8)(6W) Canisius at (4)(3W) Niagara

(7)(5E) Mercyhurst at (5)(4E) Robert Morris

Quarterfinals

(1) RIT vs. (12) American International

(2) Air Force vs. (11) Sacred Heart

(3) Holy Cross vs. (8) Canisius

(6) Connecticut vs. (7) Mercyhurst

Semifinals

(1) RIT vs. (6) Connecticut

(2) Air Force vs. (3) Holy Cross

Championship

(1) RIT vs. (2) Air Force

Tournament awards

All-Tournament Team
G Jason Torf (Air Force)
D Tim Kirby (Air Force)
D Scott Mathis (Air Force)
F Jacques Lamoureux* (Air Force)
F Sean Murphy (RIT)
F Cole Schneider (Connecticut)
* Most Valuable Player(s)

References

Atlantic Hockey Tournament
Atlantic Hockey Tournament